10:20 is the third album by British indie rock band The Twang, released on 29 October 2012.

Track listing
Words by Watkin, Saunders, Etheridge. Except track 9 (written by Vini Reilly). Music by The Twang.

Personnel 
 Phil Etheridge - vocals, bass, photography (cover)
 Jon Watkin - guitar
 Martin Saunders - vocals
 Jon Simcox - guitar, programming, producer, engineer
 Stu Hartland - guitar (tracks 1, 7)
 Ash Sheehan - trumpet (track 2) 
 Rebecca Wilson - additional vocals (track 2)
 Neil Claxton - mixing
 Duncan Mills - mixing (track 2)
 Philip J Harvey - mixing (track 6)
 Andy Hawkins - additional mixing (track 3)
 Charlotte Kelly – sleeve
 Miami Stu – art direction
 Sam Gooding - photography
 John Dawkins - management

References 

The Twang albums
2012 albums